Glitterbust are an American experimental electric guitar duo composed of Kim Gordon and Alex Knost. Their self-titled debut album was released on Burger Records on March 4, 2016. The band named themselves after a song by Royal Trux off of their Twin Infinitives LP.

Discography
Glitterbust (March 4, 2016).

References

American musical duos
Musical groups established in 2015
Rock music duos
Sonic Youth
2015 establishments in the United States